Hacıməlik (known as Əzizbəyov until 1999) is a village and municipality in the Goygol Rayon of Azerbaijan. It has a population of 3,871.

References

Populated places in Goygol District